John Curtis Ager Jr. (born 1949) is a former Democratic politician from North Carolina. Ager served as a member of the North Carolina House of Representatives, representing the 115th district (including constituents in western Buncombe County) from 2015 to 2023. On December 6, 2021, Ager announced that he wouldn't seek re-election in 2022.

Political positions
In early 2018 Ager voiced support for background checks, waiting periods, and ending the “gun show loophole.”

Electoral history

2020

2018

2016

2014

Committee assignments

2021-2022 session
Appropriations
Appropriations - Agriculture and Natural and Economic Resources
Agriculture
Environment
Local Government
Regulatory Reform
Wildlife Resources

2019-2020 session
Appropriations
Appropriations - Agriculture and Natural and Economic Resources
Agriculture
State and Local Government
Regulatory Reform
Wildlife Resources

2017-2018 session
Appropriations
Appropriations - Agriculture and Natural and Economic Resources
Appropriations - General Government
Agriculture
State and Local Government
Education - K-12

2015-2016 session
Appropriations
Appropriations - General Government
Agriculture
Local Government
Wildlife Resources
Education - K-12
Children, Youth and Families
Judiciary IV

References

External links

Living people
1949 births
People from Atlanta
People from Buncombe County, North Carolina
University of North Carolina at Asheville alumni
21st-century American politicians
Democratic Party members of the North Carolina House of Representatives